The Kastamonu Subregion (Turkish: Kastamonu Alt Bölgesi) (TR82) is a statistical subregion in Turkey.

Provinces 

 Kastamonu Province (TR821)
 Çankırı Province (TR822)
 Sinop Province (TR823)

See also 

 NUTS of Turkey

External links 
 TURKSTAT

Sources 
 ESPON Database

Statistical subregions of Turkey